Constantine Ypsilantis ( Konstantinos Ypsilantis; ; 1760 – 24 June 1816), was the son of Alexander Ypsilantis, a key member of an important Phanariote family, Grand Dragoman of the Porte (1796–99), hospodar of Moldavia (1799–1802) and Walachia (1802–06), and a Prince through marriage to the daughter of Alexandru Callimachi.

Resistance against the Ottoman Empire

Ypsilantis had joined in a conspiracy to liberate Greece and, on its discovery, fled to Vienna, had been pardoned by the sultan and in 1799 appointed by him hospodar of Moldavia. Deposed in 1805, he escaped to St Petersburg, and in 1806, at the head of some 20,000 Russians, returned to Bucharest, where he set to work on a fresh attempt to liberate Greece.

Union of Moldavia and Wallachia

From 1806, during Russian occupation of the Principalities of Moldavia and Wallachia, Russia encouraged their provisional union under Prince Constantine Ypsilanti. Russia preferred their union for improved relations with the Principalities and their formal union was planned for 1830.

Ypsilantis' plans were ruined by the Peace of Tilsit and in 1807 he emigrated with his family to Russia.

Legacy
Ypsilantis died, in Kiev, where he had served as commandant of the Pechersk Fortress since 1807. He left five sons, of whom two played a conspicuous part in the Greek War of Independence: Alexander and Demetrios.

References

Sources
East, The Union of Moldavia and Wallachia, 1859 - An Episode in Diplomatic History, Thirlwall Prize Essay for 1927, Cambridge University Press (1929).

1760 births
1816 deaths
Dragomans of the Porte
Rulers of Moldavia
Rulers of Wallachia
Constantine
Recipients of Ottoman royal pardons
Rulers of Moldavia and Wallachia
Diplomats from Istanbul
Constantinopolitan Greeks